Brongniartella byssoides (Goodenough & Woodward) Schmitz (Vertebrata byssoides) is a small red marine alga.

Description
Brongniartella byssoides  is a small brownish-red marine alga which grows to a length of about 30 cm. It consists of tufts of erect axes. The erect axes are polysiphonous, that is each axes is composed of axial cells each covered with periaxial cells without cortication. All the branches produce secondary lateral branches which produce the ultimate final monosiphonous ramuli. The mature thallus pyramidal in shape. The plants are attacked by rhizoids with disc-like bases.

Reproduction
The species is dioecious, the sexes occur on separate plants, with clusters of spermatangial branches, sessile cystocarps and tetrasporangia.

Distribution
Widespread around the British Isles including the Isle of Man and the Shetland Islands. Recorded also from Norway to Portugal and the Mediterranean.

References

Rhodomelaceae